Abdulla Nigmatovich Aripov (born 24 May 1961, in Tashkent) is an Uzbek politician who serves as the prime minister of Uzbekistan, in office since 14 December 2016. Aripov is a member of the Uzbekistan Liberal Democratic Party. He was deputy prime minister from 2002 to 2012 and again in 2016.

Career

Politics
On May 30, 2002 Aripov was appointed as Deputy Prime Minister of Uzbekistan – Head of Complex on Information and Telecommunications Technologies Issues – Director-General of Communications and Information Agency of Uzbekistan. Then from October 2009 – oversees the Social Sphere, Science, Education, Health, Culture and responsible for contacts with CIS-partners. On February 4, 2005 Aripov was appointed as Deputy Prime Minister. Then in a reshuffle in August 2012 he was appointed Head of Complex on Information Systems and Telecommunications.

In September 2016 he was again appointed as Deputy Prime Minister.

On 12 December 2016, he was nominated by the ruling party to form a cabinet. On 14 December, he was confirmed as Prime Minister by the parliament. On 15 December, he formed his cabinet.

Personal life
Aripov is married and has five daughters. He is a recipient of the state awards Ordens “Do’stlik” and “Mehnat shuhrati” (Friendship and Labor Glory).

References

1961 births
Living people
Politicians from Tashkent
Prime Ministers of Uzbekistan
Uzbekistan Liberal Democratic Party politicians
Uzbekistani Muslims